Hatch is a hamlet in the Central Bedfordshire district of Bedfordshire, England.

It is located a little over a mile south-west of the market town of Sandy, and forms part of the Northill civil parish. Budna and Thorncote Green are located just to the west.

Hamlets in Bedfordshire
Central Bedfordshire District